The 2016–17 San Diego State men's basketball team represented San Diego State University during the 2016–17 NCAA Division I men's basketball season. This was head coach Steve Fisher's 18th season at San Diego State. The Aztecs played their home games at Viejas Arena as members in the Mountain West Conference. They finished the season 19–14, 9–9 in Mountain West play to finish in a tie for fifth place. They defeated UNLV and Boise State to advance to the semifinals of the Mountain West tournament where they lost to Colorado State. They Aztecs did not participate in a postseason tournament for the first time since the 2004–05 season.

On April 11, 2017, head coach Steve Fisher announced his retirement after 18 seasons at San Diego State and 27 seasons overall as NCAA head coach, handing over the head coaching job to his longtime assistant Brian Dutcher.

Previous season
The Aztecs finished the 2015–16 season 28–10, 16–2 in Mountain West play to win the Mountain West regular season championship. They defeated Utah State and Nevada to advance to the championship game of the Mountain West tournament where they lost to Fresno State. As a regular season conference champion who failed to win their conference tournament, they received an automatic bid to the National Invitation Tournament where they defeated IPFW, Washington, and Georgia Tech to advance to the tournament semifinals at Madison Square Garden. There, they lost to eventual NIT Champion George Washington.

Offseason

Departures

Incoming transfers

2016 recruiting class

Roster

Schedule and results

|-
!colspan=9 style=| Exhibition

|-
!colspan=9 style=| Non-conference regular season

|-
!colspan=9 style=| Mountain West regular season

|-
!colspan=9 style=| Mountain West tournament

References

San Diego State Aztecs men's basketball seasons
San Diego State
San Diego State
San Diego State